Juan Alfonso Fernandez-Barquin (born March 6, 1983) is an American attorney and politician who served as a member of the Florida House of Representatives for the 119th district, which includes part of Miami-Dade County.

Career
Fernandez-Barquin defeated three opponents in the August 28, 2018, Republican primary, winning 44.2% of the vote. In the November 6, 2018, general election, Fernandez-Barquin won 53.09% of the vote, defeating Democrat Heath Rassner and a third candidate.

References

Hispanic and Latino American state legislators in Florida
Republican Party members of the Florida House of Representatives
Living people
21st-century American politicians
Florida International University alumni
Washington College of Law alumni
1983 births
Latino conservatism in the United States